Jordan Bridges (born November 13, 1973) is an American actor, best known as Frankie Rizzoli on Rizzoli & Isles (2010–2016).

Early life
Bridges was born in Los Angeles County, California, and is the son of actor Beau Bridges and Julie Bridges. He is the nephew of Jeff Bridges and the grandson of Lloyd Bridges and Dorothy Bridges. 
Bridges' maternal grandfather, Marvin Landfield, was the son of Russian-Jewish immigrants.

Career

Bridges first acted professionally at the age of five in the television film The Kid from Nowhere (1982), directed by his father. After a break he returned once more in the television film The Thanksgiving Promise (1986), starring the entire Bridges family. Not wanting to be a child actor, he left acting and attended L.A.'s Oakwood School. The school had a strong emphasis on the arts, which rekindled his interest in acting. He followed it up as a theater major and literature minor at New York's Bard College. Before earning his bachelor's degree, Bridges spent his junior year in England, studying at the prestigious London Academy of Music and Dramatic Art, living in a tiny basement flat in Chelsea, and attending West End theatre productions on free passes.

Although classically trained, he worked as a "cater waiter" in New York and Los Angeles for several years each before he started getting roles in films, television series, and theater. He starred in the short-lived NBC series Conviction as Nick Potter, a lawyer from an "old money" family of prominence, who leaves his job at a private law firm to join the Manhattan District Attorney's Office. He is also known for his starring role in the 2002 film New Suit, the 2004 film Samantha: An American Girl Holiday, and the 2009 Love Comes Softly movie series films Love Takes Wing and Love Finds a Home, as well as a recurring role on the TV series Dawson's Creek. He also had a guest role in the two-part, fourth-season-premiere episode of Charmed, as Paige's boyfriend, Shane. He played the recurring character Tom Hastings in the Bionic Woman series. He has also played supporting roles in the films Drive Me Crazy (1999), Frequency (2000), Happy Campers (2001), and Mona Lisa Smile (2003). In A Holiday Engagement (2011) he plays David, a man hired to impersonate a woman's fiancé to her family over Thanksgiving. Similarly, in Family Plan (2005) he plays Buck, a man hired to impersonate a woman's husband to her boss for the night.

Bridges appeared in the TNT drama series Rizzoli & Isles, which premiered in July 2010 and concluded in September 2016.

Personal life
Bridges married artist-inventor Caroline Sherman Eastman in 2002 at Burning Man and again on January 2, 2003, at a small ceremony in Kauai, Hawaii.  They have two children: Caroline (nicknamed Lola) and Orson.

Filmography

Film

Television

References

External links

 
 

1973 births
American people of Russian-Jewish descent
American male film actors
American male television actors
Bard College alumni
Bridges family
Living people
American male child actors